FC Alania-2 Vladikavkaz is a Russian football team from Vladikavkaz, founded in 2011. It played from 2011 to 2013–14 seasons in the FNL 2, and re-entered the league once again for the 2021–22 season.

Club history
Alania-2 is the reserves team of FC Alania Vladikavkaz. Reserves teams of the Russian Premier League clubs participate in a separate competition, where this team played in 2010. After Alania was relegated to the Russian First Division, Alania-2 entered into the Russian Second Division. Alania's reserves played on the professional level before, as FC Spartak-d Vladikavkaz (Russian Third League in 1995), FC Alania-d Vladikavkaz (Russian Third League in 1997) and FC Alania-2 Vladikavkaz (Russian Second Division in 1998).

During the 2013–14 season, the parent team Alania went bankrupt and was liquidated. Before the 2014–15 season, Alania-d was renamed to FC Alania Vladikavkaz.

Before the 2021–22 season, Alania's farm club was registered once again for the FNL 2, as Alania-2.

Current squad
As of 22 February 2023, according to the Second League website.

See also
FC Alania Vladikavkaz

References

External links
  Official site
  Team profile at www.2liga.ru
  Team profile at onedivision.ru

Association football clubs established in 2011
Football clubs in Russia
Sport in Vladikavkaz
FC Spartak Vladikavkaz
2011 establishments in Russia